Amos Giles Rhodes (1850–1928) was an Atlanta, Georgia furniture magnate. He was born in 1850 in Henderson, Kentucky.  In 1875, he came to Atlanta as a laborer for the L & N Railroad.  In 1879, he began a small furniture company which would grow into a large furniture business and make Rhodes a "pillar of the community".  Some sources credit him with inventing the installment plan for buying furniture.  Mr. A.G. Rhodes died in 1928, leaving a substantial endowment.

Architectural legacy
Rhodes was associated with the following historic buildings in Atlanta:
 Rhodes Hall, his residence on Peachtree Street in Midtown
 the Rhodes-Haverty Building in Downtown Atlanta
 the A.G. Rhodes Health & Rehab building (a.k.a. A.G. Rhodes Home) in Grant Park

Family
He married Amanda Dougherty in 1876

External links
 Rhodes' biography on City of Atlanta site
 Rhodes Hall - Le Reve historical marker

References
 Rhodes Memorial Hall, City of Atlanta
 "History", A.G. Rhodes Health & Rehab

1850 births
1928 deaths
History of Atlanta
Businesspeople from Atlanta
People from Henderson, Kentucky